Ankita Mayank Sharma  (born February 7, 1987) (born Ankita Sharma) is an Indian television actress. She worked in Sony TV's show Baat Hamari Pakki Hai as Sanchi Shravan Jaiswal, Rangrasiya as Laila, Chakravartin Ashoka Samrat as Noor Khorasan.

Personal life
Ankita had pursued a course in classical dance and music. When she completed her course in 2008, she was awarded with the Visharad degree. This degree was very important for Ankita, as she always wanted to be a dance choreographer. Ankita got engaged to Mayank Sharma on 24 January 2015  and married on 9 March 2015.

Television
 2009–2010 Agle Janam Mohe Bitiya Hi Kijo as Ratna
 2010–2011 Baat Hamari Pakki Hai as Sanchi Sharma / Sanchi Shravan Jaiswal
 2011–2012 Sawaare Sabke Sapne... Preeto  as Manpreet Dhillon aka Preeto
 2012–2013 Amrit Manthan as Rajkumari Nimrit Kaur Sodhi / Natasha Oberoi 
 2014 Rangrasiya as Laila
 2014 Gustakh Dil as Nikhil's Maami
 2015 Chakravartin Ashoka Samrat as Noor Khorasan
 2015 Kuch Toh Hai Tere Mere Darmiyaan as Vidya Venket
 2016 Darr Sabko Lagta Hai (Episode #32)
 2016-2017 Devanshi as Sarla
 2018-2019 Beechwale Bapu Dekh Raha Hain as Sheetal
 2019  Laal Ishq as Nandita (Episode 112) / Widow (Episode 139)
 2020 Yehh Jadu Hai Jinn Ka!'' as Roshni's biological mother; Rubina's sister-in-law
Sankarabharanam telugu movie as a kidnapper

References

Living people
1987 births
Indian television actresses